Giuseppe Pambianchi (born 27 January 1957) is a former Italian male long-distance runner who competed at two editions of the IAAF World Cross Country Championships at senior level (1982, 1984).

References

External links
 Giuseppe Pambianchi profile at Association of Road Racing Statisticians

1951 births
Living people
Italian male long-distance runners
Italian male cross country runners